or  is a Japanese martial art, a gendai budo (contemporary martial art).
It is part of the martial arts derived from aikido, which appeared after its founder's death in 1969. It started in early 70's with the creation of the Ki Society of Koichi Tohei, the previous Aikikai's Chief Instructor. This martial art focuses on mind and body coordination and is based on aikido techniques and Japanese yoga and promote non-violent conflict solving and self-development.

He was taught Shinshin-t%C5%8Ditsu-d%C5%8D (also known as 'Japanese yoga') by Tempu Nakamura. He felt that Tempu Sensei's teaching and explanation made clear what Morihei Ueshiba was able to do in his aikido (particularly the idea that the mind moves the body). As a result he started bringing in exercises from Shinshin-t%C5%8Ditsu-d%C5%8D, such as 'unbendable arm' and 'unraisable body' into his aikido teaching. He started to do this as Chief Instructor of the Aikikai, while Morihei Ueshiba was still alive. He also felt the concepts of Shinshin-toitsu-do were more clearly applicable to daily life. It was later that he formalised his style, including leaving out some aikido techniques that he felt were ineffective against a partner who could coordinate mind and body. Although Tohei Sensei gave the Ki Development aspect of his style the name Shinshin-toitsu-do, it only covered part of Tempu Sensei's curriculum/teaching, and some of it was modified by him.

The teaching of Ki Aikido has been split between different federations, each reflecting the experience of their founders: Ki Society with Koichi Tohei and his son Shinichi Tohei, Ki no Kenkyukai Internationale Association with Kenjiro Yoshigasaki and Ki Federation of Great Britain with Ken Williams (or Kenneth Williams).

Ki Aikido features
Each federation has evolved its own set, but some common features are: 

 Emphasis on aikido principles, ki (or coordination of mind and body ) principles
 Katas (bokken, jo, tanto)
 Warmups with ki development exercises, coordination of mind and body, with some moves re-used during aikido techniques
 Teaching putting emphasis on "ki" (roughly translated by "energy, will, charisma, health") and its development. 
 Ki class, aikido class
 Ki tests
 Kyu/dan grades system (similar to other gendai budo), ki exam, aikido exam
 Kiatsu (healing method by transmitting ki developed by Tohei Koichi)
 Aikido technique standing, kneeling, with one or more persons, randori
 Defenses against jo, tanto, bokken
 
 Breathing exercises ("Ki Breathing")
 Concept of "one point" , close to the hara or tanden in traditional Japanese martial arts)

4 principles for mind and body coordination
 Keep one point 
 Relax completely
 Keep weight underside / Have a light feeling  (variation)
 Extend Ki

These principles guide the practitioners to keep "mind and body" coordinated and can be applied in daily life (walking, pushing a door, handling a conflict, ...). 
To follow one is to follow all. To lose one is to lose all.

5 principles for aikido 
 Ki is extending
 Know your partner's mind
 Respect your partner's ki
 Put yourself in your partner's place
 Lead with confidence

These principles also guide the practitioners, when doing aikido techniques. 
They roughly represent the state of mind of an aikidoka: being aware of your surroundings, trying to understand what your partner/attacker is trying to do, adjusting your moves to match his moves and lead (no clash, etc..).

References

External links
Ki Federation of Great Britain

Shinichi Tohei Blog (english) 

Ki Aikido Japan (ki no kenkyukai)

Ki Aikido Literature

Dojos for Ki no kenkyukai Internationale

Aikido
Gendai budo
Meditation
Physical exercise
Spiritual practice
Dō
Japanese martial arts terminology